The Hoffman Round Barn, also known as Gentry Round Barn, is a historic round barn and national historic district located near Wolftown, Madison County, Virginia.  The district encompasses two contributing buildings, one contributing site and one other contributing structure.  The barn was built in 1913. It is a -story, wood frame barn with 12 sides and a 12-sided standing-seam metal, mansard-like roof. A wooden center silo protrudes several feet above the level of the main roof, has a gable-roofed dormer on the east side, and is capped by a metal roof, resembling a cupola. Associated with the barn are the contributing Hoffman farmhouse and family cemetery.

It was listed on the National Register of Historic Places in 2009.

References

Historic districts on the National Register of Historic Places in Virginia
Infrastructure completed in 1913
Buildings and structures in Madison County, Virginia
Round barns in Virginia
Barns on the National Register of Historic Places in Virginia
National Register of Historic Places in Madison County, Virginia
1913 establishments in Virginia